The Moondarra Rail Trail is a little-maintained, 7  km section of the former Walhalla Railway in Gippsland, Victoria. Located entirely within the Moondarra State Park, the surface is entirely dirt and partially overgrown.

References 

Rail trails in Victoria (Australia)